This is a list of 140 species in Venezillo, a genus of woodlice in the family Armadillidae.

Venezillo species

 Venezillo aenigma (Barnard, 1932) i c g
 Venezillo agataensis (Nunomura, 1991) c g
 Venezillo aguayoi (Boone, 1934) i c g
 Venezillo alberti (Barnard, 1932) i c g
 Venezillo albescens (Budde-Lund, 1909) i c g
 Venezillo albus (Nunomura, 1990) c g
 Venezillo alticola (Barnard, 1932) i c g
 Venezillo apacheus (S. Mulaik and D. Mulaik, 1942) i c g
 Venezillo arizonicus (S. Mulaik & D. Mulaik, 1942) i c g b
 Venezillo articulatus Mulaik, 1960 i c g
 Venezillo beebei (Van Name, 1924) i c g
 Venezillo bellavistanus Schultz, 1995 i c g
 Venezillo berlandi (Paulian de Felice, 1940) i c g
 Venezillo bituberculatus (Budde-Lund, 1910) i c g
 Venezillo bolivianus (Dollfus, 1897) i c g
 Venezillo boneti Mulaik, 1960 i c g
 Venezillo boninensis (Nunomura, 1990) c g
 Venezillo booneae (Van Name, 1936) i c g
 Venezillo brevipalma Nunomura, 2003 c g
 Venezillo brevispinis (Pearse, 1915) i c g
 Venezillo cacahuampilensis (Bilimek, 1867) i c g
 Venezillo californicus (Budde-Lund, 1885) i
 Venezillo canariensis (Dollfus, 1893) i c g
 Venezillo castor (Barnard, 1932) i c g
 Venezillo celsicauda (Barnard, 1932) i c g
 Venezillo chamberlini (S. Mulaik and D. Mulaik, 1942) i c g
 Venezillo chiapensis Rioja, 1955 i c g
 Venezillo clausus (Budde-Lund, 1885) i c g
 Venezillo colomboi (Arcangeli, 1930) i c g
 Venezillo coloratus (Barnard, 1932) i c g
 Venezillo congener (Budde-Lund, 1904) i c g
 Venezillo crassus (Budde-Lund, 1904) i c g
 Venezillo culebrae (Van Name, 1936) i c g
 Venezillo daitoensis (Nunomura, 1990) c g
 Venezillo disjunctus (Barnard, 1932) i c g
 Venezillo dollfusi (Barnard, 1932) i c g
 Venezillo donanensis (Nunomura, 1992) c g
 Venezillo dugesi (Dollfus, 1896) i c g
 Venezillo dumorum (Dollfus, 1896) i c g
 Venezillo elegans (Nunomura, 1990) c g
 Venezillo festivus (Budde-Lund, 1904) i c g
 Venezillo fillolae Rodriguez & Barrientos, 1993 i c g
 Venezillo flavescens (Brandt, 1833) i c g
 Venezillo furcatus (Barnard, 1932) i c g
 Venezillo galapagoensis (Miers, 1877) i c g
 Venezillo gigas (Miers, 1877) i c g
 Venezillo glomus (Budde-Lund, 1898) i c g
 Venezillo gordoniensis (Barnard, 1932) i c g
 Venezillo grenadensis (Budde-Lund, 1893) i c g
 Venezillo hasegawai (Nunomura, 1991) c g
 Venezillo hendersoni (Boone, 1934) i c g
 Venezillo herscheli (Barnard, 1932) i c g
 Venezillo hiurai (Nunomura, 1991) c g
 Venezillo hypsinephes (Barnard, 1932) i c g
 Venezillo jamaicensis (Richardson, 1912) i c g
 Venezillo kaokoensis (Barnard, 1932) i c g
 Venezillo kogmani (Barnard, 1932) i c g
 Venezillo kunigamiensis (Nunomura, 1991) c g
 Venezillo lacustris Taiti & Ferrara, 1987 i c g
 Venezillo lepidus Nunomura, 2003 c g
 Venezillo limenites (Barnard, 1932) i c g
 Venezillo lineatus (Nunomura, 1990) c g
 Venezillo llamasi Rioja, 1954 i c g
 Venezillo longipes (Budde-Lund, 1909) i c g
 Venezillo longispinis (Richardson, 1912) i c g
 Venezillo longispinus Nunomura, 2003 c g
 Venezillo macrodens (Barnard, 1932) i c g
 Venezillo macrosoma Mulaik, 1960 i c g
 Venezillo meiringi (Barnard, 1932) i c g
 Venezillo mexicanus (Verhoeff, 1933) i c g
 Venezillo microphthalmus (Arcangeli, 1932) i c g
 Venezillo mineri (Van Name, 1936) i
 Venezillo mixtus (Budde-Lund, 1904) i c g
 Venezillo moneaguensis (Van Name, 1936) i c g
 Venezillo montagui (Barnard, 1932) i c g
 Venezillo multipunctatus (Budde-Lund, 1885) i c g
 Venezillo nanus (Budde-Lund, 1910) c g
 Venezillo natalensis (Collinge, 1917) i c g
 Venezillo nebulosus (Barnard, 1932) i c g
 Venezillo nevadensis (Mulaik, 1960) i c g
 Venezillo nigricans (Brandt, 1833) i c g
 Venezillo nigrorufus (Dollfus, 1893) i c g
 Venezillo oaxacanus (Van Name, 1936) i c g
 Venezillo oharaensis (Nunomura, 1992) c
 Venezillo orbicularis (Budde-Lund, 1885) i c g
 Venezillo orosioi (Mulaik, 1960) i g
 Venezillo orphanus (Barnard, 1932) i c g
 Venezillo osorioi (Mulaik, 1960) c g
 Venezillo ovampoensis (Barnard, 1924) i c g
 Venezillo pachytos (Barnard, 1932) i c g
 Venezillo parvus (Budde-Lund, 1885) i c g b
 Venezillo perlatus (Dollfus, 1896) i c g
 Venezillo phylax (Van Name, 1936) i c g
 Venezillo pilula (Barnard, 1932) i c g
 Venezillo pisum (Budde-Lund, 1885) i c g
 Venezillo pleogoniophorus (Rioja, 1951) c g
 Venezillo pleogoniphorus (Rioja, 1951) i g
 Venezillo polythele (Barnard, 1932) i c g
 Venezillo pongolae (Barnard, 1937) i c g
 Venezillo pruinosus (Arcangeli, 1950) i c g
 Venezillo pseudoparvus Ferrara & Taiti, 1985 i c g
 Venezillo pumilus (Budde-Lund, 1893) i c g
 Venezillo pusillus (Budde-Lund, 1909) i c g
 Venezillo quadrimaculatus (Budde-Lund, 1909) i c g
 Venezillo ramsdeni (Boone, 1934) c g
 Venezillo rubropunctatus (Budde-Lund, 1893) i c g
 Venezillo rufescens (Budde-Lund, 1909) i c g
 Venezillo saldanhae (Barnard, 1932) i c g
 Venezillo sanchezi (Boone, 1934) i c g
 Venezillo scaberrimus (Dollfus, 1893) i c g
 Venezillo schultzei Verhoeff, 1933 i c g
 Venezillo shuriensis (Nunomura, 1990) c g
 Venezillo silvarum (Dollfus, 1896) c g
 Venezillo silvicola Mulaik, 1960 i c
 Venezillo similis (Budde-Lund, 1885) c g
 Venezillo soleiformis (Nunomura, 1991) c g
 Venezillo soyatlanensis Mulaik, 1960 i c g
 Venezillo steenbrasi (Barnard, 1932) i c g
 Venezillo stuckchensis (Mulaik, 1960) c g
 Venezillo sylvicola (Mulaik, 1960) c g
 Venezillo tanneri (S. Mulaik and D. Mulaik, 1942) i c g
 Venezillo tenerifensis Dalens, 1984 c g
 Venezillo tomiyamai (Nunomura, 1991) c g
 Venezillo tradouwi (Barnard, 1932) i c g
 Venezillo trifolium (Dollfus, 1890) i c g
 Venezillo truncorum (Budde-Lund, 1893) i c g
 Venezillo tuberosus (Budde-Lund, 1904) i c g
 Venezillo tugelae (Barnard, 1932) i c g
 Venezillo venustus (Budde-Lund, 1893) i c g
 Venezillo verrucosus (Budde-Lund, 1904) i c g
 Venezillo vincentis (Budde-Lund, 1904) c g
 Venezillo viticola (Dollfus, 1896) i c g
 Venezillo walkeri (Pearse, 1911) i c g
 Venezillo watsoni (Van Name, 1936) i c g
 Venezillo wheeleri (Van Name, 1936) i c g
 Venezillo yaeyamanus (Nunomura, 1990) c g
 Venezillo yonaguniensis (Nunomura, 1990) c g
 Venezillo zigzag (Dollfus, 1896) i c g
 Venezillo zonalis (Nunomura, 1991) c g
 Venezillo zwartbergensis (Barnard, 1932) i c g

Data sources: i = ITIS, c = Catalogue of Life, g = GBIF, b = Bugguide.net

References

Articles created by Qbugbot
Venezillo